Donie Hanlon (1937 – 31 January 2023) was an Irish Gaelic footballer. At club level played with Gracefield and at inter-county level with the Offaly senior football team. Hanlon usually lined out as a forward.

Playing career

Hanlon first played Gaelic football as a schoolboy at Portarlington CBS. He simultaneously lined out as a minor with the Gracefield club, before winning an Offaly JFC title in 1958. Hanlon was drafted onto the St. Patrick's amalgamated team, and added an Offaly SFC title in 1959. 

Hanlon was first selected for the Offaly senior football team during the 1958-59 league. He spent a season with the junior team before returning to the senior team as captain in 1960.  Offaly won the Leinster SFC for the first time under Hanlon's captaincy. He was at full-forward when Offaly were beaten by Down in the 1961 All-Ireland final.

Death

Hanlon died on 31 January 2023, at the age of 85.

Honours

Gracefield
Leinster Senior Club Football Championship: 1961, 1970, 1972
Offaly Senior Football Championship: 1961, 1970, 1972
Offaly Junior Football Championship: 1958

St Patrick's
Offaly Senior Football Championship: 1959

Offaly
Leinster Senior Football Championship: 1960 (c), 1961

References

1937 births
2023 deaths
Gracefield Gaelic footballers
Offaly inter-county Gaelic footballers